Allan John Melville (1921-1977)  was an Australian rugby league footballer who played in the 1940s.  He played for South Sydney in the New South Wales Rugby League (NSWRL) competition.

Playing career
Melville made his first-grade debut for Souths in 1947.  

In 1949, Melville made 15 appearances as Souths claimed the minor premiership and reached the grand final against St George.  Melville played in the match as Souths lost the grand final 19–12 with St George claiming their second premiership.  This in turn would be Melville's last game for the club.

References

South Sydney Rabbitohs players
1921 births
1977 deaths
Rugby league props
Australian military personnel of World War II